USS Pratt (DE-363) was a  in service with the United States Navy from 1944 to 1946.

Namesake
Malcolm Lewis Pratt was born on 5 August 1891 in Bellefontaine, Ohio. He became Assistant Surgeon with rank of Lieutenant (junior grade), USNRF on 27 March 1917. He received the Navy Cross for extraordinary heroism in reestablishing an advanced aid station just demolished by shell-fire in Lucy-le-Bocage on 11 June 1918, and in continuing to dress and evacuate the wounded under direct and continuous shell-fire at Thiancourt 13 September. He resigned from the Navy on 13 October 1919.

On 2 May 1941 he reported for active duty again with the rank of Lieutenant Commander, MC, USNR. Attached to a Marine Division, he was reported missing in action as of 13 August 1942, when he failed to return from a reconnaissance patrol near the village Mantanikau on Guadalcanal.

Construction and commissioning
Laid down in April 1944, launched in June 1944, and commissioned more than four months later, Pratt served as an escort for convoys between New Guinea and the Philippines during early 1945. She then spent three months training and escorting submarines while also patrolling shipping lanes off the Philippines. After the end of the war in the Pacific, Pratt helped establish seaplane anchorages in Korea and China before being decommissioned in late 1945. She remained in reserve until being sold for scrap in 1973.

Design 

The John C. Butler-class destroyer escorts were designed to meet a need for large numbers of cheap anti-submarine escort ships for ocean convoys, and as a result carried little anti-surface armament. The class was part of an initial requirement for 720 escorts to be completed by the end of 1944, which was significantly reduced.

She displaced  standard and  full load, with a complement of 14 officers and 201 enlisted men.

Armament and sensors 
Pratt mounted a main battery of two single turret-mounted  /38 caliber guns, one forward and one aft of the superstructure, to protect against surface and aerial threats, directed by the Mark 51 Gunnery Fire-Control System. In addition, she was armed with six  Bofors anti-aircraft (AA) guns in two twin mounts, superfiring over the 5-inch guns, also controlled by the Mark 51 fire-control system, and ten single Oerlikon  light AA guns. Equipped with three  centerline torpedo tubes, the ship also carried two depth charge racks, eight K-gun depth-charge throwers and one Hedgehog spigot mortar as anti-submarine weapons. She was equipped with a QC series sonar and a SL-1 surface search radar.

Construction and service 
Pratt was named for Malcolm Lewis Pratt, a World War I Navy Cross recipient, and his son John Lester Pratt, both of whom were killed in action during the Guadalcanal campaign. The ship's keel was laid down by the Consolidated Steel Corp., Ltd. at their yard in Orange, Texas on 11 April 1944. The destroyer escort was launched on 1 June 1944; sponsored by Mrs. Malcolm L. Pratt, and commissioned 18 September 1944.

World War II Pacific Theatre operations
 
After shakedown off Bermuda, Pratt sailed with Escort Division 85 for the Panama Canal and southwest Pacific Ocean. Arriving at Manus, Admiralty Islands on 7 January 1945, Pratt was escort commander for convoys running between New Guinea and the Philippines until 25 May. Between 25 May and 25 August she trained and escorted British and U.S. submarines in the Subic Bay area and patrolled the shipping lanes off the northwestern coast of Luzon.

China and Korea operations
 
Pratt next joined TG 70.4 and sailed to Okinawa where she joined the Korean occupation force.

Post-war decommissioning
On 21 November the ship departed the Asian continent for Okinawa, thence to the United States for inactivation. Arriving at San Pedro, Los Angeles on 16 December, she decommissioned on 14 May 1946 and was berthed at Stockton, California as a unit of the Pacific Reserve Fleet. Transferred to the Mare Island Group in 1959, she remained a unit of the Reserve Fleet until she was struck on 15 March 1972. Pratt was sold for scrap on 15 January 1973 and broken up.

References

Bibliography

External links

 NavSource Online: Destroyer Escort Photo Archive - USS Pratt (DE-363)

John C. Butler-class destroyer escorts
Ships built in Orange, Texas
1944 ships
World War II frigates and destroyer escorts of the United States